Polyclaeis is a genus of true weevil family.

List of species
 Polyclaeis africanus
 Polyclaeis albicans
 Polyclaeis albidopictus
 Polyclaeis angusticollis
 Polyclaeis atomarius
 Polyclaeis auriventris
 Polyclaeis barbicauda
 Polyclaeis bohemani
 Polyclaeis castaneipennis
 Polyclaeis cinereus
 Polyclaeis cribrosus
 Polyclaeis curvispinis
 Polyclaeis decorus
 Polyclaeis despectus
 Polyclaeis difficilis
 Polyclaeis diffusus
 Polyclaeis equestris
 Polyclaeis krokisi
 Polyclaeis livingstoni
 Polyclaeis longicornis
 Polyclaeis maculatus
 Polyclaeis maculifer
 Polyclaeis mellyi
 Polyclaeis nobilitatus
 Polyclaeis obliteratus
 Polyclaeis ocellatus
 Polyclaeis octomaculatus
 Polyclaeis octoplagiatus
 Polyclaeis opacus
 Polyclaeis ornatissimus
 Polyclaeis parcus
 Polyclaeis patrizii
 Polyclaeis pilipes
 Polyclaeis plagiatus
 Polyclaeis plumbeus
 Polyclaeis prasinus
 Polyclaeis raffrayi
 Polyclaeis relegandus
 Polyclaeis rugosus
 Polyclaeis scotti
 Polyclaeis signatus
 Polyclaeis squamuliventris
 Polyclaeis striatus
 Polyclaeis stuhlmanni
 Polyclaeis sulphureus
 Polyclaeis sumptuosus
 Polyclaeis suturatus
 Polyclaeis trapezicollis
 Polyclaeis uniformis
 Polyclaeis variegatus
 Polyclaeis vestitus
 Polyclaeis viridanus
 Polyclaeis vittatus
 Polyclaeis wittei

References 

 Global Species
 Polyclaeis genus at Gwannon.com
 Encyclopedia of Life

Entiminae